Ben-Zeev may refer to:

 Aaron Ben-Ze'ev (born 1949), Israeli philosopher and President of the University of Haifa
 Judah Leib Ben-Ze'ev (1764–1811), Galician Jewish grammarian
 Moshe Ben-Ze'ev (1911-1995), Israeli jurist and Attorney General of Israel from 1963 to 1968
 Noam Ben-Zeev (born 1954), Israeli music critic and journalist
 Yoram Ben-Zeev (born 1944), Israeli diplomat

Hebrew-language surnames